National Route 312 is a national highway of Japan connecting Miyazu, Kyoto and Himeji, Hyōgo in Japan, with a total length of 153.5 km (95.38 mi).

References

National highways in Japan
Roads in Hyōgo Prefecture
Roads in Kyoto Prefecture